Chinese bird spider  is an English name given to several species of old-world tarantulas which are found in China and Vietnam, including:

 Cyriopagopus hainanus, primarily found on Hainan Island, off the southeastern coast of China; synonym Haplopelma hainanum
 Cyriopagopus schmidti, found in Vietnam; synonyms Haplopelma schmidti, Haplopelma huwenum and Selenocosmia huwena

Set index articles on spiders